Rais, also known as Iris, Iraida, Irais, Herais or Rhais, is a martyr venerated by the Roman Catholic and the Eastern Orthodox churches.
According to one account, she was the daughter of a Christian priest named Peter living in Alexandria, Roman Province of Egypt. At the age of twelve, she was sent to live in a women's monastery at Tamman. One day in 303 AD, during a time of widespread persecution of Christians during the reign of the Roman Emperor Diocletian, she went to a well to draw water with other nuns. On the way, they saw a ship with a group of nuns, monks, and other Christians in chains, who were being abused by Loukianos and his men. Rais berated the abusers and insisted that they kill her as well if they were killing Christians. They took her into custody. When the ship had reached Antinoöpolis, Rais was one of the first to die. When Loukianos yelled out, "I spit upon the Christian God," Rais objected, stepped up and spat into the tyrant's face. Loukianos then ordered the girl to be tortured and beheaded.

Notes

3rd-century births
303 deaths
Christian child saints
Saints from Roman Egypt
4th-century Christian martyrs
3rd-century Egyptian people
4th-century Egyptian people
Late Ancient Christian female saints
4th-century Christian saints
Executed ancient Roman women
People executed by decapitation
3rd-century Egyptian women
4th-century Egyptian women
Roman-era Alexandrians
3rd-century Roman women
4th-century Roman women